RockNess 2013 was the eighth RockNess Festival to take place. It was confirmed by organisers via social media on 24 December 2012 and took place on the weekend of 7–9 June 2013.

On 18 January 2013 organisers announced the addition of a loch side camping area to the festival site.

A limited number of £99 earlybird tickets were released on 28 January 2013 which sold out within minutes, the tier-2 £129 tickets were released the same morning which then in turn quickly sold out.

Line-up
Line-up :

References

RockNess
2013 music festivals
June 2013 events in the United Kingdom
2013 in Scotland
2013 in British music